Transformers: Rescue Bots Academy (or simply Rescue Bots Academy) is a Flash animated children's television series on Discovery Family. It is based on toy manufacturer Hasbro's Transformers franchise and a sequel of Transformers: Rescue Bots, sharing the name with the Rescue Bots season three episode called "Rescue Bots Academy". The first two episodes were previewed on December 8, 2018. The series officially premiered on January 5, 2019. The voice cast of Rescue Bots does not reprise their roles, with existing characters being recast with New York-based voice actors.

Premise 
School is in session at the Transformers: Rescue Bots Academy, and Griffin Rock's heroes Heatwave the Fire-Bot, Chase the Police-Bot, Blades the Copter-Bot, and Boulder the Construction-Bot are back and ready to train a new batch of recruits. Just arriving on Earth from their home world of Cybertron, young Cube player Hot Shot, aspiring rescue hero Hoist, the enthusiastic Whirl, Construction-bot Wedge and field medic appropriately named Medix have the honor of being the first class in history to enroll in the Rescue Bots Academy, a highly advanced training facility located at a top-secret base. With encouragement from Optimus Prime, Bumblebee, and Grimlock, the new recruits learn the power of team building through simulated and real-life rescue missions that highlight the importance of heroism, teamwork, and most importantly, friendship.

Characters

Autobots

Rescue Bots Recruits 
 Hot Shot (voiced by Pierce Cravens) is a former Cube player recruited by Optimus Prime, who also gives him a Mul-T-Change T-cog that lets him use a different vehicle mode per day. His regular vehicle mode is a red and yellow ATV, while his alternate forms are a red jet plane and a yellow and red hovercraft boat. He later gains a fourth vehicle form in Season 2 by scanning Heatwave's fire truck mode.
 Whirl (voiced by Courtney Shaw) is an enthusiastic police trainee who, like Chase, has studied the rules of being a Rescue Bot, and who serves as the team's optimist and sister figure. She transforms into a blue and light gray police helicopter, and later adopts a Chase's blue squad police car form during Season 2's Multi-change story arc.
 Hoist (voiced by Alan Trinca) is an aspiring inventor and mechanic who transforms into a teal green tow truck. In Season 1, he was revealed to be afraid of dinosaurs when Grimlock arrived at the academy, later fully overcoming his fear in Season 2's "Mission Dinobot." During season 2's T-cog story arc, he scanned Grimlock's Tyrannosaurus to become a Dinobot himself and now has two transformations.
 Medix (voiced by Adam Andrianopoulous) is a Rescue Bots recruit who does not like surprises and works purely with logic. He serves as the team's intelligence officer on missions and transforms into a white emergency response car with green  and a red light bar mounted on the roof. During Season 2's T-Cog story arc, he gains a second form of a helicopter at Blades's rescue helicopter mode in white & orange.
 Wedge (voiced by Mason Hensley) is a former Decepticon turned leader who turns into an orange payloader. He had a rivalry with Hot Shot in Season 1 and shares Blades' fanboy attitude towards Bumblebee. He even has a collection of trading cards detailing all the major Autobots called "Heroes of Cybertron." His Decepticon past is revealed in the Season 2 episode "More Than Meets the Eye" when the team is not certain how to deal with Laserbeak. Like Hot Shot, Optimus Prime believed he had potential and recruited him. He later gains a second sports car mode in homage to his idol Bumblebee, Wedge has a fear of heights as first stated in season one.

Rescue Force Sigma-17 & Faculty 
 Heatwave (voiced by Paul Guyet) is the leader of Rescue Force Sigma-17 and the academy's chief instructor. He transforms into a red fire engine with an extending ladder, a red fire boat, and a brontosaurus due to the events of the original TV cartoon. He becomes Hot Shot's mentor in the second season, Later new gained scanned the fire truck of Hot Shot.
 Chase (voiced by Frank Cwiklik) is a second-in-command for the Rescue Bots, Chase is a by-the-books police officer and one of Whirl's favourite teachers. He transforms into a dark blue and white police car, as well as a robotic stegosaurus due to the events of the original TV series. He becomes Whirl's mentor in the second season, Later new gained scanned the blue squad police car of Whirl.
 Boulder (voiced by Keyon Williams) is a gentle giant who serves as the bulk and science officer of Rescue Force Sigma-17. He serves as the trainees' teacher on Earth studies and transforms into a green bulldozer in addition to his robotic triceratops form from the original TV show's third season.
 Blades (voiced by Michael Hansen) is a perky Rescue bot who turns into a rotund orange and white rescue helicopter and is one of Whirl's favourite teachers. In the original TV series, he also transformed into a white and orange pterodactyl. He becomes Medix's mentor in the second season, Later new gained scanned the white rescue helicopter of Medix.
 Grimlock (voiced by Terrence Flint) – portrayed as a hybrid of his Fall of Cybertron and RID 2015 selves, Grimlock is an old friend of Optimus Prime and Bumblebee who serves as the bots' gym and field operations coach, He transforms into a mechanical T-Rex and still has his cat phobia from Transformers: Robots in Disguise. second season, He becomes a peer mentor of Hoist and helps him overcome his fear to dinosaurs, Later new gained scanned the T-Rex of Hoist.
 Bumblebee (voiced by Jeremy Levy) is a member of Optimus Prime's team who transforms into a yellow muscle car with black racing stripes, and Grimlock's former commanding officer from Bee Team. He becomes Wedge's mentor in the second season, Later new gained scanned the sports car of Wedge.
 Rachet (voiced by Todd Perimutter) is Optimus Prime's friend and chief medical officer who transforms into a white Ford ambulance. He is later revealed to be Medix's uncle and one of the academy's guest lecturers.
 Perceptor (voiced by Jeremy Levy) is an Autobot science and intelligence officer who served alongside Optimus during the Great War for Cybertron. He transforms into a red science expedition vehicle and can downsize himself into a microscope that can be used by other Transformers. In his debut episode, Bumblebee convinces Perceptor to join the academy as its math and science professor.

Cube Players 
 Scorch (voiced by Adam Andrianopoulous) is Hot Shot's old friend and leader of the Cyberblazers Cube team.
 Mach is a Cube player who turns into a sports car.
 Glow (voiced by Courtney Shaw) is a female Cube player who resembles the Decepticon Glowstrike from 2015's Robots in Disguise spinoff to Transformers Prime. She seems to turn into a red motorcycle.

Others 
 Optimus Prime (voiced by Jake Foushee, Hiro Diaz in "Recruits") is the benevolent leader of the Autobots who turns into a semi-trailer truck cab.
 Sludge (voiced by Billy Bob Thompson) is a Dinobot science officer who transforms into a metallic apatosaurus with red and silver body Armor. He has not been seen since the Transformers Prime tie-in comics, Rage of the Dinobots, and Transformers Beast Hunters issues 1–8.
 Snarl (voiced by Mark Ashton) is the Dinobots' tactical officer and one of Grimlock's old war friends who tends to be grouchy. He transforms into a mechanical stegosaurus with red spinal plates.
 Slash (voiced by Alex Hairston) is a female dinobot who turns into a velociraptor. She is an expert tracker and an old friend of Grimlock's who prefers to work alone. After getting herself in trouble while trying to rescue Griffin Rock news reporter Huxley Prescott, Whirl teaches her it pays to have a partner watching out for her.
 Brushfire (voiced by Bimini Wright) is a lone Cybertronian on Earth in Australia who transforms into an orange halftrack ATV. She previously appeared exclusively in the toy line, and makes her onscreen debut in Season 2's 31st episode "Brushfire," where she meets and befriends Whirl when the Rescue Bots arrive to help her with mobs of kangaroos.

Decepticons 
 Lazerbeak is Soundwave's former helper and a retired Decepticon. Lazerbeak was found injured by the Rescue Bots in "More than Meets the Eye" when his shuttle was damaged and Hoist retrieved his cassette form before waking him up. After Wedge got rid of their prejudice, the Bots took him back to the academy to heal the wound on his left wing.

Humans 
 Cody Burns (voiced by Andy Zou) is the first kid who befriended Heatwave's team in the original series, and the youngest member of the Burns Family Emergency Response team; he helps Heatwave teach the recruits whenever he is not too busy.
 Wes (voiced by Xander Crowell) is a member of Cody's Teen Pioneer troupe who is a fan of the Rescue Bots and idolizes Wedge.
 Francine Greene (voiced by Kaitlin Becker) is Cody's best friend since childhood and the second youth to learn the Autobots' true nature in the original series, Frankie is the eldest child of Griffin Rock's resident genius scientist, Dr. Ezra Greene, and is a science prodigy. She and Doc make their first reappearance in the Season 2 episode “Partners.”

Other Cast 
 Tough Luck Chuck (voiced by Todd Perlmutter)
 Scraplets – 
 Citadel Secundus (voiced by Frank Cwiklik) is a Titan

Episodes

Series overview 
<onlyinclude>

Season 1 (2019) 
 This season takes place during the Rescue Bot recruits' first year at the academy.

Season 2 (2020-21) 
 This season takes place during the Rescue Bot recruits' final test of second year at the academy.
On September 5, 2018, the series was renewed for a second season of another 52 11–minute episodes that premiered on March 21, 2020. The first six episodes of season 2 were released earlier on Google Play on February 14, 2020. It is also the last season of the series.

Production 
Shortly after its acquisition by Hasbro, Boulder Media Limited started developing a Transformers series, The series was first announced on June 7, 2017, with Transformers: Rescue Bots officially ending production. along with Transformers: Cyberverse.

On July 16, 2017, voice actor D.C. Douglas, who voiced Chase in Transformers: Rescue Bots, announced that he would not reprise his role in this series. He has also confirmed that the voice cast for this series are non-union New York-based voice actors.

On July 23, 2017, Ben Ward joined the series as writer.

On August 4, 2017, at Hasbro Investor Day 2017, the show's runtime was announced to be 11 minutes.

On December 25, 2017, it was revealed that the first season consists of 52 11-minute episodes.

On March 21, 2018, the series was announced to air on Discovery Family in Fall 2018.

A trailer was released on April 6, 2018.

On September 5, 2018, Ciarán Morrison and Mick O'Hara joined the series as writers. Additionally, the series was renewed for a second season of another 52 11-minute episodes.

A poster was released on October 3, 2018, and the release date has been rescheduled back to 2019.

A sneak peek consisting of the first two episodes aired on December 8, 2018. The series began proper airings on January 5, 2019.

In late 2020, it was announced that the show would end production after the Season 2 finale, ending the show with the same number of episodes as its predecessor.

Broadcast and release 
In the United States, the series premiered with a two episode sneak peek on December 8, 2018 and officially premiered on January 5, 2019, on Discovery Family. It premiered on Nickelodeon in Germany, Nick Jr. in India, TiJi in France, Frisbee in Italy, Tiny Pop in the UK, TVP ABC in Poland, Karusel in Russia, Treehouse TV in Canada, Minimax in CEE and Arutz HaYeladim in Israel.

References

External links 
 Transformers: Rescue Bots Academy on Transformers Wiki
 

2010s American animated television series
2020s American animated television series
2010s American comic science fiction television series
2020s American comic science fiction television series
2019 American television series debuts
2021 American television series endings
Television shows set in the United States
American sequel television series
American children's animated action television series
American children's animated space adventure television series
American children's animated comic science fiction television series
American children's animated science fantasy television series
American children's animated superhero television series
American flash animated television series
Irish children's animated action television series
Irish children's animated space adventure television series
Irish children's animated comic science fiction television series
Irish children's animated science fantasy television series
Irish children's animated superhero television series
Irish flash animated television series
Animated television series about children
English-language television shows
Discovery Family original programming
Television series by Hasbro Studios
Rescue Bots Academy